Bernard Simondi (born 28 July 1953) is a French former footballer and coach.

He played for SC Toulon, Stade Lavallois, FC Tours and AS Saint-Étienne.

After his playing career, he became a coach with Al-Nassr, Puget, Aubagne, Grenoble, US Créteil, Guinea, Benin, ES Sahel, Burkina Faso, ES Sétif, Al-Kharitiyath and Al-Ahly Doha.

He was shortlisted for the Guinea national team job in July 2016.

External links and references

1953 births
Living people
Association football defenders
French footballers
SC Toulon players
Stade Lavallois players
Tours FC players
AS Saint-Étienne players
Ligue 1 players
Ligue 2 players
French football managers
Guinea national football team managers
Burkina Faso national football team managers
Grenoble Foot 38 managers
US Créteil-Lusitanos managers
Étoile Sportive du Sahel managers
Al Kharaitiyat SC managers
Al-Faisaly FC managers
Al-Ta'ee managers
ES Sétif managers
JS Saoura managers
Olympique Club de Khouribga managers
Saudi Professional League managers
French expatriate football managers
Expatriate football managers in Algeria
Expatriate football managers in Burkina Faso
Expatriate football managers in Guinea
Expatriate football managers in Oman
Expatriate football managers in Qatar
Expatriate football managers in Saudi Arabia
Expatriate football managers in Tunisia
Expatriate football managers in the United Arab Emirates
French expatriate sportspeople in Algeria
French expatriate sportspeople in Saudi Arabia